Cham Bagh-e Sofla (also Romanized as Cham Bāgh-e Soflá) is a village in Veysian Rural District, Veysian District, Dowreh County, Lorestan Province, Iran. At the 2006 census, its population was 163, in 46 families.

References 

Towns and villages in Dowreh County